The 2021 London Broncos season is the 42nd year in the club's history, the second consecutive season out of the Super League and their sixth season at Trailfinders Sports Ground. Currently coached by Tom Tsang, the Broncos would compete in both the 2021 Betfred Championship and the 2021 Challenge Cup.

2021 squad

Transfers
Gains

Losses

Tables

2021 Betfred Championship table - Regular Season

2021 fixtures and results

2021 RFL Championship

2021 Challenge Cup / 2021 RFL 1895 Cup

Statistics

References

External links
London Broncos website
FIXTURES

London Broncos seasons
London Broncos season
2021 in rugby league by club
2021 in English rugby league